South Albany High School (SAHS) is a public high school located in Albany, Oregon, United States.

History
After splitting from Albany Union High School in 1971, students that were entering as Seniors that year were given the choice to stay and graduate from Albany Union or go to South Albany High School and be part of the first graduating class from there. The school chose "Rebel" as their mascot; athletic teams were nicknamed "The Rebels”. The Rebel was removed and changed to the RedHawks on April 25, 2018.

The school's colors are red and grey and were not changed when the mascot was changed.

Sports 
In 2004, the cheerleading program placed second against 5A and 6A teams at state competition, as well as winning all pre-state competitions.  The school also had six All-Americans, three Les Schwab Bowl participants, and qualified for nationals.  The football, soccer, dance and cheerleading programs have all gone to either district playoffs/championships or state championships in recent years. In 2016, the cheerleading program qualified and competed at the National High School Cheerleading Competition. The dance team, the Southern Belles, won state championships in 2014, 2015, and 2017 in the 5A division at the OSAA Dance and Drill State Championships. In 2018, SA football won league champs along with the warriors and qualified for the playoffs. Along with the varsity basketball boys team qualified for state and placed 6th in 5A rankings overall.

Academics
In 2008, 75% of the school's seniors received a high school diploma. Of 308 students, 231 graduated, 42 dropped out, and 13 received a modified diploma, and 22 were still in high school the following year. By 2018, 88% of the 302 seniors graduated. Twenty-eight students dropped out that year.

Arson incident

On April 1, 2015, classes were cancelled for the following days due to a large fire that had destroyed the school's choir room, cooking class rooms, band room and cafeteria, but school was resumed the following week. By 7 am, snorkel water cannons were being used to prevent the four-alarm fire from spreading to the rest of the school. The man who had set the fire, Zachary Lee Burghart, was convicted a few months later for arson after pleading guilty.

References

High schools in Linn County, Oregon
Buildings and structures in Albany, Oregon
Educational institutions established in 1971
Public high schools in Oregon
School buildings in the United States destroyed by arson
1971 establishments in Oregon